The Theresianum Gymnasium is an all-day secondary and high school located in Mainz, Germany. It was founded in 1927 by the Johannesbund e.V.. The high school is a Catholic school and still sponsored by the Roman Catholic Diocese of Mainz. This does not mean that the school does not accept students with a different religion. Students have the opportunity to achieve the highest academic high school degree, the Abitur after year 12 while they enroll in school for year 5.

References

Buildings and structures in Mainz
Schools in Rhineland-Palatinate
Gymnasiums in Germany